Thomas Alan Dutra (born September 4, 1972) is a retired American soccer goalkeeper. Since 2009, he has been the goalkeeper coach for Seattle Sounders FC of Major League Soccer; Dutra was previously an assistant for the pre-MLS Sounders from 2006 to 2008.

Player

Youth
Dutra graduated from Timberline High School in 1991.

Professional
In 1992, Dutra played in Mexico and in 1994, he played in Germany.  In 1995, Dutra played for the Oregon Surge of the USISL.  He also spent time in the Netherlands and Germany.  In April 1996, he signed with the Seattle Sounders of the USISL A-League.  Dutra backed up starter Marcus Hahnemann.  In March 1997, Dutra moved to the New Orleans Riverboat Gamblers.  He broke his ankle in the first half of the second game of the season, losing the rest of the season.  He came back in 1998 only to break a rib during an early season game.  In 1999, he moved to the Lehigh Valley Steam.

Coach
In 2006, Dutra became the goalkeeper coach for the Seattle Sounders of the USL First Division.  On December 28, 2008, the expansion Seattle Sounders FC of Major League Soccer announced they had hired Dutra as the team's goalkeeper coach.

References

External links
 Seattle Sounders coaching profile

1972 births
Living people
People from Lacey, Washington
American soccer coaches
American soccer players
Association football goalkeepers
Cascade Surge players
Lehigh Valley Steam players
New Orleans Riverboat Gamblers players
Seattle Sounders (1994–2008) players
A-League (1995–2004) players
Soccer players from Washington (state)
Seattle Sounders FC non-playing staff
Pacific Lutheran Lutes coaches
Timberline High School (Lacey, Washington) alumni